Brunhes may refer to:

Bernard Brunhes (1867–1910), French geophysicist
Brunhes–Matuyama reversal, the reversal of the earth's magnetic field approximately 781,000 years ago named after Brunhes and Motonori Matuyama
Jean Brunhes (1869–1930), French geographer

See also
Brunhes-Chavany syndrome or Fahr's syndrome, a rare genetic neurological disorder
Mid-Brunhes Event, a climatic shift approximately 430,000 years ago